Crenidium is a genus of flowering plants belonging to the family Solanaceae.

Its native range is Western Australia.

Species:
 Crenidium spinescens Haegi

References

Solanaceae
Solanaceae genera